The Spain national U-20 basketball team is the representative for Spain in international basketball competitions, and it is organized and run by the Spanish Basketball Federation. The team represents Spain at the FIBA Europe Under-20 Championship. It represents Spain in international under-21 and Under-20 (under age 21 and under age 20) men's basketball competitions.

FIBA Under-21 World Championship

FIBA Europe Under-20 Championship

References

See also
Spanish Basketball Federation
Spain national youth basketball teams

Men's national under-20 basketball teams
Basketball